Fred Davies (9 January 1906 – 16 June 1978) was an Australian rules footballer who played with Fitzroy in the Victorian Football League (VFL).

A New South Welshman, Davies arrived at Fitzroy from Sydney club Eastern Suburbs. Davies returned to the state at the end of the 1934 VFL season, joining St George, a team he would both captain and coach. He had been captain of Fitzroy for most of 1934, promoted when original captain Jack Cashman moved to Carlton after the opening two rounds.

See also
 1927 Melbourne Carnival

Footnotes

1906 births
1978 deaths
Australian rules footballers from New South Wales
Fitzroy Football Club players
East Sydney Australian Football Club players
St George AFC players